Generosa Ammon (March 22, 1956, Laguna Beach, California – August 22, 2003, New York City) was the widow of multimillionaire New York businessman Ted Ammon, who was murdered during their bitter divorce battle. Generosa and her lover Daniel Pelosi were both suspects in Ammon's bludgeoning death, but Generosa died before charges could be brought against her. Pelosi was later convicted.

Life
Born Generosa Rand LeGaye, she was raised by a single mother, Marie Theresa LeGaye. When Generosa was 10 years old, her mother died. After her mother's death she was raised by various relatives. She graduated from the University of California, Irvine in 1981, and moved to New York to be an artist.

While working as a real estate agent, she met Ted Ammon when she called him after he failed to keep an appointment for an apartment she was to show him. They married in 1986 and adopted a twin boy and girl from Ukraine, whom they named Greg and Alexa. They were about to finalize their divorce in October 2001 when Ted Ammon was found beaten to death in his Long Island home. As he had failed to change his will, Generosa inherited the bulk of his estate. According to an inventory filed with the New York State Surrogates Court, Ammon's estate was valued at $97 million shortly after his death. The document, compiled by his executors, J.P. Morgan Chase & Co. (JPM ), detailed Ammon's assets to the last penny.  J.P. Morgan took the unusual step of challenging Generosa as co-executor of his estate.

Later years and death
Just four months after the murder, on January 15, 2002, she married her boyfriend, Daniel Pelosi, an unlicensed electrician whom she met when he showed up at the doorstep of her Manhattan townhouse because he was told she was hiring workers for a remodeling job. While dying of breast cancer, she was offered immunity from prosecution to testify against Pelosi before a grand jury, but refused. She cut Pelosi out of her will, but gave him a $2 million legal settlement which he used for legal expenses. 

Generosa died of cancer on August 22, 2003. She left her estate to her two children, Alexa and Greg; however, their inheritance was only $1 million each "after taxes, attorneys’ fees and funds lost to Pelosi’s squandering." Generosa appointed Kathryn Mayne, the children's nanny, as her children's legal guardian. She also bequeathed a life interest in the house where Ammon was murdered to Mayne to raise the twins. In 2005, however, full custody of the twins was awarded to Ted's sister, Sandra Williams. 

Pelosi was convicted of Ammon's murder on December 13, 2004, and was sentenced to 25 years to life in prison. Generosa Ammon was portrayed by Poppy Montgomery in the 2005 made-for-television movie Murder in the Hamptons.

References

External links
Ted Ammon's assets 

1956 births
2003 deaths
People from Laguna Beach, California
Deaths from breast cancer
American real estate brokers
Deaths from cancer in New York (state)
University of California, Irvine alumni